Terry Dale Burrows (born November 28, 1968) is an American former professional baseball pitcher. Burrows attended McNeese State University, where he played college baseball for the Cowboys. He was drafted by the Texas Rangers in the seventh round of the 1990 MLB draft. Terry played four years in Major League Baseball, two with the Rangers (–), and one each with the Milwaukee Brewers and San Diego Padres. In 50 career games pitched, Burrows had a 2–2 record with an ERA of 6.42.

For six seasons (2008–2013), Burrows was the head baseball coach at McNeese State.

Head coaching records
The following is a table of Burrows's yearly records as an NCAA head baseball coach.

References

External links

1968 births
Living people
American expatriate baseball players in Canada
American expatriate baseball players in Japan
Baseball coaches from Louisiana
Baseball players from Louisiana
Butte Copper Kings players
Charlotte Rangers players
Columbus Clippers players
Edmonton Trappers players
Gastonia Rangers players
Las Vegas Stars (baseball) players
Major League Baseball pitchers
McNeese Cowboys baseball coaches
McNeese Cowboys baseball players
Milwaukee Brewers players
New Orleans Zephyrs players
Nippon Professional Baseball pitchers
Oklahoma City 89ers players
Orix BlueWave players
Ottawa Lynx players
Rochester Red Wings players
Sacramento River Cats players
San Diego Padres players
Sportspeople from Lake Charles, Louisiana
Texas Rangers players
Tulsa Drillers players